João Amaral may refer to:

Amaral (footballer, born 1954), Brazilian footballer
Andrade (footballer, born 1981), Brazilian footballer
João Amaral (footballer, born 1991), Portuguese footballer
João Maria Ferreira do Amaral (1803–1849), Portuguese military officer and politician